Puka Saya (Quechua puka red, saya slope, "red slope", also spelled Pucasaya) is a mountain in the Arequipa Region in the Andes of Peru, about  high. It is situated in the Arequipa Province, Tarucani District, north of Lake Salinas. Puka Saya lies southwest of Kunturi.

References 

Mountains of Peru
Mountains of Arequipa Region